WRAX (1600 kHz) is an adult standards-formatted broadcast AM radio station licensed to Bedford, Pennsylvania, serving Bedford and Bedford County, Pennsylvania. WRAX is owned and operated by Cessna Communications, Inc.

Known as WAYC from 1974 to 1993 and again from 2009 to 2020, the station adopted the call letters WRAX on September 15, 2020.

WRAX also broadcasts on FM translator W293DF at 106.5 MHz in Bedford, Pennsylvania.

References

External links
RAX 106.5 Online

1974 establishments in Pennsylvania
Adult standards radio stations in the United States
Radio stations established in 1974
RAX (AM)